Zanussi can refer to the following:

Zanussi, an Electrolux-owned home appliance company
Krzysztof Zanussi, a Polish film director
Zanussi (balloon), 1978 trans-Atlantic balloon attempt
Zanussi (surname), an Italian surname